The BRP Datu Cabaylo (MMOV-3001) (also known as DA-BFAR MMOV-3001) is the lead ship of a new class of 30-meter multi-mission offshore civilian patrol vessels operated by the Philippine government's Bureau of Fisheries and Aquatic Resources. The ship was built by Josefa Slipways, Inc. in Sual, Pangasinan using a design from Australian ship designer Incat Crowther, and was launched on 14 June 2022. It is currently completing fit-out and sea trials and is expected to be commissioned within 2022. Its intended mission is to guard Philippine waters against illegal fishing, maritime protection and fisheries control, with secondary mission of supporting law enforcement agencies like the Philippine Coast Guard in patrolling Philippine territorial waters and Exclusive Economic Zones.

References 

Ships of the Bureau of Fisheries and Aquatic Resources
2022 ships